The Pre-Indo-European languages are any of several ancient languages, not necessarily related to one another, that existed in Prehistoric Europe, Asia Minor, Ancient Iran and Southern Asia before the arrival of speakers of Indo-European languages. The oldest Indo-European language texts are Hittite and date from the 19th century BC in Kültepe (modern eastern Turkey), and while estimates vary widely, the spoken Indo-European languages are believed to have developed at the latest by the 3rd millennium BC (see Proto-Indo-European Urheimat hypotheses). Thus, the Pre-Indo-European languages must have developed earlier than or, in some cases, alongside the Indo-European languages that ultimately displaced almost all of them.

A handful of the pre-Indo-European languages still survive; in Europe, Basque retains a localised strength, with fewer than a million native speakers, but the Dravidian languages remain very widespread in the Indian subcontinent, with over 200 million native speakers (the four major languages being Telugu, Tamil, Kannada and Malayalam). Some of the pre-Indo-European languages are attested only as linguistic substrates in Indo-European languages. In much of Western Asia the pre-Indo-European Semitic languages and language isolates were never supplanted by Indo-European with the exception of modern Iran and swathes of Turkey.

Terminology 
Before World War II, all the unclassified languages of Europe and the Near East were commonly referred to as Asianic languages, and the term encompassed several languages that were later found to be Indo-European (such as Lydian), and others (such as Hurro-Urartian, Hattic), Elamite, Kassite, Colchian and Sumerian, which were classified as distinct pre Indo-European language families or language isolates. In 1953, the linguist Johannes Hubschmid identified at least five pre-Indo-European language families in Western Europe: Eurafrican, which covered North Africa, Italy, Spain and France; Hispano-Caucasian, which replaced Eurafrican and stretched from Northern Spain to the Caucasus Mountains; Iberian, which was spoken by most of Spain prior to the Roman conquest of the Iberian peninsula; Libyan, which was spoken mostly in North Africa but encroached into Sardinia; and Etruscan, which was spoken in Northern Italy. The term pre-Indo-European is not universally accepted, as some linguists maintain the idea of the relatively late arrival of the speakers of the unclassified languages to Europe, possibly even after the Indo-European languages, and so prefer to speak about non-Indo-European languages. A new term, Paleo-European, is not applicable to the languages that predated or coexisted with Indo-European outside Europe.

Surviving languages
These pre-Indo-European languages have survived to modern times:

 in the Indian subcontinent, the Dravidian languages, Munda languages (a branch of the Austroasiatic languages), Tibeto-Burman languages, Nihali, Kusunda, Vedda and Burushaski.
 in the Caucasus, the Kartvelian, Northeast Caucasian, Northwest Caucasian which together include Georgian, Abkhazian, Circassian, Chechen, Ingushetian, Dagestani etc. 
 in the Iberian Peninsula, Basque.
 in Northern Eurasia, the Paleosiberian languages and the Uralic languages (including Finnish, Estonian, Mordvin, Udmurt, Mari, Komi and Sami/Lapp), although in Finland there is also evidence of a non-Indo-European Pre-Finno-Ugric substrate, as well as Paleo-European substrates preceding both.
In Western Asia, the only Indo-European languages found are Farsi and other Iranic languages of Iran and the related Kurdish, and to a lesser degree Armenian.

Languages that contributed substrates to Indo-European languages
Examples of suggested or known substrate influences on specific Indo-European languages include the following:

Pre-Anatolian:
Hattic language
Colchian
Akkadian (aka Assyrian and Babylonian)
Pre-Armenian:
Hurro-Urartian languages
Aramaic (Assyrian Neo-Aramaic and Syriac)
Substrate in Vedic Sanskrit, proposed sources for which include:
Bactria–Margiana Archaeological Complex (possible source of Sanskrit vocabulary, language not attested)
Harappan language (not attested in readable script; see Indus script)
Lullubi language 
Vedda language
Burushaski language
Dravidian languages 
Munda languages
Nihali language
Tibeto-Burman languages
Substrates to early undifferentiated or partly-differentiated Indo-European in Western Europe:
Old European hydronymy (possibly Indo-European, as originally thought by Krahe)
Vasconic substrate hypothesis
Tyrsenian languages
Pre-Greek substrate languages, which may have included:
Minoan language (see also Linear A, Cretan hieroglyphs) 
Eteocretan language (may have been a descendant of Minoan)
Eteocypriot language (see also Cypro-Minoan script)
Lemnian language (probably related to Etruscan)
Pre-Germanic:
Germanic substrate hypothesis
Pre-Celtic languages:
Insular Celtic:
Goidelic substrate hypothesis
For the British Isles, see Celtic settlement of Great Britain and Ireland
Continental Celtic:
Paleohispanic languages
Vasconic languages
Proto-Basque
Aquitanian language (often thought to be the direct ancestor of Basque)
Iberian language
Tartessian language (classification as Celtic has been proposed)
Pre-Italic languages:
Tyrsenian languages
Etruscan language
Raetic language (probably related to Etruscan)
 Camunic language (probably Raetic)
 Elymian language (perhaps Indo-European)
 North Picene language
 Paleo-Sardinian language (also called Paleosardinian, Protosardic, Nuraghic language)
 Sicanian language
Ligurian language (perhaps Indo-European)

Other propositions are generally rejected by modern linguists:

 Atlantic (Semitic) languages

Attested languages
Languages attested in inscriptions include the following:

Tartessian
Iberian
Aquitanian
Etruscan
Rhaetian
Camunic
Lemnian
North Picene
Sicanian
Minoan
Eteocretan
Eteocypriot
Hattic
Urartian
Elamite
Kaskian
Gutian

Unattested but hypothetised languages 
These languages are presumed to be non-Indo-European, althrough we don't have any inscriptions of them:
Paleo-Sardinian
Paleo-Corsican

Later Indo-European expansion
Further, there have been replacements of Indo-European languages by others, most prominently of most of the Celtic languages by Germanic or Romance varieties because of Roman rule and the invasions of Germanic tribes.

Also, however, languages replaced or engulfed by Indo-European in ancient times must be distinguished from languages replaced or engulfed by Indo-European languages in more recent times. In particular, the vast majority of the major languages spread by colonialism have been Indo-European (the major exceptions being Arabic, Turkish and Mandarin Chinese), which has in the last few centuries led to superficially similar linguistic islands being formed by, for example, indigenous languages of the Americas (now surrounded by English, Spanish, Portuguese, Dutch, and French), as well as of several Uralic languages (such as Mordvin, Udmurt, Mari, Komi etc) and Caucasian languages (such as Circassian, Abkhaz Dag etc) now surrounded by Russian) Many creole languages have also arisen based upon Indo-European colonial languages.

See also
Paleo-European languages
Paleo-Balkan languages
Languages of Neolithic Europe
Pre-Indo-European (disambiguation)
Pre-Finno-Ugric substrate in Sámi languages
Proto-Euphratean language

References

Bibliography

Archaeology and culture 
 Anthony, David with Jennifer Y. Chi (eds., 2009). The Lost World of Old Europe: The Danube Valley, 5000–3500 BC.
 Bogucki, Peter I. and Pam J. Crabtree (eds. 2004). Ancient Europe 8000 BC—1000 AD: An Encyclopedia of the Barbarian World. New York: Charles Scribner's Sons.
 Gimbutas, Marija (1973). Old Europe c. 7000–3500 B.C.: the earliest European cultures before the infiltration of the Indo-European peoples. The Journal of Indo-European Studies 1/1-2. 1-20.
 Tilley, Christopher (1996). An Ethnography of the Neolithic. Early Prehistoric Societies in Southern Scandinavia. Cambridge University Press.

Linguistic reconstructions 
 Bammesberger, Alfred & Theo Vennemann, eds. Languages in Prehistoric Europe. Heidelberg: Carl Winter, 2003.
 Blench, Roger, & Matthew Spriggs, eds. Archaeology and Language. Vol. 1, Theoretical and Methodological Orientations. London/NY: Routeledge, 1997.
 Dolukhanov, Pavel M. “Archaeology and Languages in Prehistoric Northern Eurasia”, Japan Review 15 (2003): 175–186. https://web.archive.org/web/20110721072713/http://shinku.nichibun.ac.jp/jpub/pdf/jr/IJ1507.pdf
 Gimbutas, Marija. The Language of the Goddess: Unearthing the Hidden Symbols of Western Civilization. San Francisco: Harper & Row, 1989.
 Greppin, John and T.L.Markey, eds. When Worlds Collide: The Indo-Europeans and the Pre-Indo-Europeans. Ann Arbor: 1990.
 Haarmann, H. “Ethnicity and language in the ancient Mediterranean”, in A companion to ethnicity in the ancient Mediterranean. Edited by J. McInerney. Wiley Blackwell, 2014, pp. 17–33. 
 Lehmann, Winfred P. Pre-Indo-European. Washington, DC: Institute for the Study of Man. 2002. .
 Mailhammer, Robert. “Diversity vs. Uniformity. Europe before the Arrival of Indo-European Languages”, in The Linguistic Roots of Europe: Origin and Development of European Languages. Edited by Robert Mailhammer & Theo Vennemann. Copenhagen: Museum Tusculanum Press, 2016.
 “Pre-Indo-European”, in Encyclopedia of the Languages of Europe. Edited by Glanville Price. Oxford: Blackwell, 1998. .
 
 Vennemann, Theo. Languages in Prehistoric Europe north of the Alps. https://www.scribd.com/doc/8670/Languages-in-prehistoric-Europe-north-of-the-Alps
 Vennemann, Theo (2008). Linguistic reconstruction in the context of European prehistory. Transactions of the Philological Society. Volume 92, Issue 2, pages 215–284, November 1994
 Woodard, Roger D. (ed., 2008) Ancient Languages of Asia Minor. Cambridge University Press.
 Woodard, Roger D. (2008) Ancient Languages of Europe. Cambridge University Press.

External links 
  Reconstructed migration of language families and archaeological cultures in Europe during the Neolithic and Chalcolithic

 
Language histories
Prehistoric Europe
Ancient Europe
Historical linguistics
Extinct languages